Scelotes sexlineatus, the striped dwarf burrowing skink, is a species of lizard which is endemic to South Africa.

References

sexlineatus
Reptiles of South Africa
Reptiles described in 1824
Taxa named by Richard Harlan